Prince Aleksei  Grigorievich Scherbatov (1776-1848) was a Russian imperial general during the Napoleonic Wars and November Uprising. Born into a noble family, he served as Mayor of Moscow for the final five years of his life.

References

External links

1776 births
1848 deaths
Imperial Russian Army generals
Governors-General of Moscow
Members of the State Council (Russian Empire)
Recipients of the Order of St. George of the Second Degree
Recipients of the Order of St. George of the Third Degree
Russian commanders of the Napoleonic Wars
Russian people of the November Uprising